Magne Landrø (24 August 1937 – 10 March 2022) was a Norwegian sport shooter. He was born in Trondheim. He competed at the 1960 Summer Olympics in Rome, and at the 1964 Summer Olympics in Tokyo. 

His achievements include a gold medal in the 1963 European championships, a World championship silver medal in free rifle in 1966, and a silver medal in 10 m air rifle at the 1969 European Shooting Championships. He further won 26 national titles in various rifle shooting events. He was crowned "Shooting King" at Landsskytterstevnet three times, in 1961, 1976 and 1981.

Landrø died in Lillestrøm on 10 March 2022, at the age of 84.

References

External links

1937 births
2022 deaths
ISSF rifle shooters
Norwegian male sport shooters
Olympic shooters of Norway
Shooters at the 1960 Summer Olympics
Shooters at the 1964 Summer Olympics
Sportspeople from Trondheim
20th-century Norwegian people